Social engineering is a top-down effort to influence particular attitudes and social behaviors on a large scale—most often undertaken by governments, but also carried out by media, academia or private groups—in order to produce desired characteristics in a target population. Social engineering can also be understood philosophically as a deterministic phenomenon where the intentions and goals of the architects of the new social construct are realized. Some social engineers use the scientific method to analyze and understand social systems in order to design the appropriate methods to achieve the desired results in the human subjects.

Overview
Decision-making can affect the safety and survival of billions of people. The scientific theory expressed by German sociologist Ferdinand Tönnies in his 1905 study The Present Problems of Social Structure, proposes that society can no longer operate successfully using outmoded methods of social management. To achieve the best outcomes, all conclusions and decisions must use the most advanced techniques and include reliable statistical data, which can be applied to a social system.

History
The Dutch industrialist J.C. Van Marken (nl) introduced the term sociale ingenieurs ("social engineers") in an essay in 1894. The idea was that modern employers needed the assistance of specialists in handling the human challenges, just as they needed technical expertise (traditional engineers) to deal with non-human challenges (materials, machines, processes). The term came to America in 1899, when the notion of "social engineering" was also launched as the name of the task of the social engineer in this sense. "Social engineering" was the title of a small journal in 1899 (renamed "Social Service" from 1900), and in 1909 it was the title of a book by the journal's former editor, William H. Tolman (translated into French in 1910). This marked the end of the usage of the terminology in the sense created by Van Marken. With the Social Gospel sociologist Edwin L. Earp's The Social Engineer, published during the "efficiency craze" of 1911 in the U.S., a new usage of the term was launched that has since then become standard: "Social engineering" came to refer to an approach of treating social relations as "machineries", to be dealt with in the manner of the technical engineer.

A prerequisite of social engineering is a body of reliable information about the society that is to be engineered and effective tools to carry out the engineering. The availability of such information has dramatically increased within the past one hundred years.  Prior to the invention of the printing press, it was difficult for groups outside of the wealthy to gain access to a reliable body of information, as the media for conveying the information was prohibitively expensive.  With the rise of the information age, information can be distributed and produced on an unprecedented scale. Similarly digital technology has increased the variety and access of effective tools. However, it has also created questionably reliable bodies of information.

Cases
Radical social-engineering campaigns can occur in countries with authoritarian governments, while non-authoritarian regimes tend to rely on more sustained social-engineering campaigns that foster more gradual, but ultimately far-reaching, change. Governments also influence behavior more subtly through incentives and disincentives built into economic policy and tax policy, for instance, and have done so for centuries.

In the 1920s the government of the Soviet Union embarked on a campaign to fundamentally alter the behavior and ideals of Soviet citizens, to replace the old social frameworks of the Russian Empire with a new Soviet culture, and to develop the New Soviet man. Commissars became agents of social engineering.
The Soviets used newspapers, books, film, mass relocations, and even architectural-design tactics to serve as a "social condenser" and to change personal values and private relationships. In a manner of violence, political executions (for example the Night of the Murdered Poets in Moscow in 1952), and the fear of becoming a victim of mass murder, played an influential role in the social engineering frameworks in Soviet Russia.  Similar examples include the Chinese "Great Leap Forward" (1958–1961), Mao's "Cultural Revolution"  (1966–1976) programs and the Khmer Rouge's deurbanization of Cambodia (1975–1979).

In Singapore, the Ethnic Integration Policy attempts to promote a mix of all races within each  subsidized housing district in order to foster social and racial cohesion while providing citizens with affordable housing.

In British and Canadian jurisprudence, changing public attitudes about a behaviour is accepted as one of the key functions of laws prohibiting the behaviour.

Social theorists of the Frankfurt School in 1918-1933 Weimar Germany, like Theodor Adorno,  observed the new phenomenon of mass culture and commented on its new  manipulative power in the 1920s. These theorists left Germany around 1930 due to the rise of the Nazi Party, and many of them became connected with the Institute for Social Research in the United States. After the consolidation of Nazi Germany from 1933 onwards, the new government also made use of methods to influence political attitudes and to redefine personal relationships. The Reich Ministry of Public Enlightenment and Propaganda under Joseph Goebbels was a synchronized, sophisticated and effective tool for shaping public opinion.

In Greece, the Greek military junta of 1967–1974 attempted to steer Greek public opinion not only by propaganda but also by inventing new words and slogans such as palaiokommatismos (old-partyism), Ellas Ellinon Christianon (Greece of Christian Greeks), and Ethnosotirios Epanastasis (nation-saving revolution, meaning coup d'état).

In Tanzania in the 1970s, the government pursued a policy of enforced villagisation under Operation Vijiji in order to promote collective farming.

The Romanian rural systematization program (especially in the 1980s) promoted "agro-industrial centres" at the expense of traditional village social structures.

In Egypt, social engineering is being practiced by the current authoritarian regime and by the media controlled by the Egyptian Intelligence, Military since  2013 coup d'état to overthrow the first democratically elected president, Mohamed Morsi.  Since then,  Sisi (President from 2014 onwards) has been using social engineering by controlling the media and Internet providers.  

In India, social engineering was effectively done in the state of Bihar, on a grand scale, to unify different castes after 2005.  The coherency of voting allegiances based on social extremes among upper castes and Dalits was challenged by this vote (Poll in Indian reference).

Karl Popper
In his classic political science book, The Open Society and Its Enemies, volume I, The Spell of Plato (1945), Karl Popper examined the application of the critical and rational methods of science to the problems of the open society. In this respect, he made a crucial distinction between the principles of democratic social engineering (what he called "piecemeal social engineering") and Utopian social engineering.

Popper wrote:

According to Popper, the difference between "piecemeal social engineering" and "Utopian social engineering" is:

See also

Demographic engineering
 Engineers of the human soul
 Eugenics
 Media manipulation
 Nudge theory
 Paternalism
 Political engineering
 Social control
 Social technology
 Total institution

References

Further reading

"The Best That Money Can’t Buy: Beyond Politics, Poverty, and War", Jacque Fresco, 2002.
 Peter Swirski. American Utopia and Social Engineering in Literature, Social Thought, and Political History. New York, Routledge, 2011.
 Charles Arthur Willard. Liberalism and the Social Grounds of Knowledge. Chicago: University of Chicago Press, 1992.
 Manufacturing Consent: The Political Economy of the Mass Media. Noam Chomsky. 1998.
 Seeing Like a State. James C. Scott. 1999.
 Social Engineering''. Adam Podgórecki. 1996.

 
Social influence
Political science terminology
Political terminology
Linguistic controversies